Myklebost or Myklebust is a village in Ålesund Municipality in Møre og Romsdal county, Norway.

Ellingsøy Church is located just west of the village of Myklebost.

References

Villages in Møre og Romsdal
Ålesund